Dyin' 2 Ball is Spice 1's 10th studio album. It was released on January 25, 2005 in the United States.

Track listing
 "Dyin' 2 ball"
 "It's a Shame"
 "Gangster As I Wanna Be" (featuring Michalobe & 40 Glocc)
 "She Got Hydraulics on It"
 "Rude Boy"
 "Fake Ass Gangsters"
 "Character"
 "Thug in Me" (featuring W.S. Bugg)
 "Candy"
 "She's So Fly"
 "Gangsta Girl"
 "Da Ghetto" (featuring Michalobe)
 "Cold of the Streets"
 "Thug Thang"
 "East Bay G's"

2005 albums
Spice 1 albums